Agra schwarzeneggeri is a species of carabid beetle. It is named after the actor Arnold Schwarzenegger. The holotype was collected in Costa Rica and first described to science in 2002.

Etymology
The binomial nomenclature references Schwarzenegger, because of the markedly developed '(biceps-like)' middle femora of the males. Erwin later remarked in an interview that his students had prepared an image of A. schwarzeneggeri and sent it out to Schwarzenegger himself: he signed it "Thanks for thinking of me - Arnold" and returned it.

Other species in the genus named by Terry L. Erwin include Agra liv, named after Liv Tyler, and Agra katewinsletae, named after Kate Winslet.

Description

See also
List of organisms named after famous people (born 1900–1949)

References

External links
CBS News (9 December 2008)
Curiosities of Biological Nomenclature

Lebiinae
Beetles of Central America
Endemic fauna of Costa Rica
Taxa named by Terry Erwin
Beetles described in 2002
Arnold Schwarzenegger